The 1966 All-Ireland Intermediate Hurling Championship was the sixth staging of the All-Ireland hurling championship. The championship ended on 18 September 1966.

Cork were the defending champions, however, they were defeated in the provincial championship. Tipperary won the title after defeating Dublin by 4-11 to 2-12 in the final.

Championship statistics

Miscellaneous

 The Ulster championship is played for the very first time, with Antrim taking the inaugural title.

External links
 Rolls of honour

Intermediate
All-Ireland Intermediate Hurling Championship